Arasairi may refer to:
 Arasairi people, an ethnic group of Peru
 Arasairi language, a language of Peru

See also 
 Arazaire, an extinct language of Peru